Mohamed Aly may refer to:
 Mohamed Aly (boxer) (born 1975), Egyptian boxer
 Mohamed Aly (gymnast), Egyptian gymnast
 Mohamed Ahmed Aly (1920–2003), Egyptian sports shooter

See also
 Muhammad Ali (1942–2016), American boxer
 Mohammad Ali (disambiguation)